Vicious Cycle may refer to:

 Vicious Cycle (album), a 2003 album by Lynyrd Skynyrd
 A Vicious Cycle, a 2008 album by Reef the Lost Cauze
 Vicious Cycle (band), a band from Sudbury, Ontario
 Vicious Cycle Software, a video game development company
 Virtuous circle and vicious circle, or vicious cycle, a complex of events that reinforces itself through a feedback loop